The Disney Gallery is an attraction and merchandise location at Disneyland in Anaheim, California, United States. It opened at its current location on Main Street, U.S.A. on October 2, 2009. From 1987-2007 it was located in New Orleans Square above the Pirates of the Caribbean attraction. The Gallery is a changing exhibition area focused primarily on artwork from Walt Disney Imagineering created in the designing of the Disneyland theme park. Merchandise relating to the current exhibition is usually available for purchase as well.

History

The Royal Suite

In the early 1960s, as construction of New Orleans Square was proceeding, Walt Disney decided he needed a bigger entertaining facility for various VIPs that came to the Park. He already had an apartment above the Fire Station on Main Street, U.S.A., but it was too small to host extensive events. Walt decided to place the suite in New Orleans Square, away from the hustle and bustle of the park.

Walt brought in set designer Dorothea Redmond, famous for the sets in Gone with the Wind, to help him with the apartment layout. To furnish and decorate the area, Walt left his wife Lilly and Walt Disney Studio set decorator Emile Kuri to collaborate, as they had on other projects (Club 33, the Firehouse Apartment, etc.). The project was christened The Royal Suite, after the street in New Orleans Square (Royal Street) the apartment's entrance is on.

Walt Disney died on December 15, 1966. As a consequence, many projects at Walt Disney Productions were either put on hold or abandoned. The Royal Suite was abandoned at the request of the surviving brother, Roy. He felt that the family could not really enjoy The Royal Suite with Walt gone. The Suite was fairly close to completion at the time of Walt's death, including infrastructure and plumbing.

New tenants
The Insurance Company of North America (INA) took over the location after the Disney apartment was abandoned. They retained Emile Kuri to decorate the space to approximate the look of the Disney apartment. INA renamed the apartment 21 Royal Street, after the apartment's numerical address. It served as a hospitality suite for INA employees and clients during their day at the park.

INA moved out of the suite in 1974 and Disneyland International moved in, using the space as executive offices. DLI helped plan Tokyo Disneyland with the Oriental Land Company. There was even a large scale model of the park placed in one of the rooms so the Japanese executives could physically see the layout of their new park.

The Gallery
DLI moved out in the mid-1980s when they outgrew their headquarters. The space was left with an uncertain future. At the same time, Imagineer Tony Baxter was put on a project to improve guest traffic around the Pirates of the Caribbean attraction. The queue for Pirates would get so long at times that it would block the walkway into New Orleans Square and Bear Country.

Baxter finally decided on the current configuration, with the queue going underneath a themed footbridge, thereby freeing the walkway. He then set his sights on Walt's old Royal Suite, just above the queue. Baxter designed a pair of ornamental staircases that would hug the footbridge and create a unique frame for the building exterior. Baxter had thought that a beautiful place like Walt's suite was going to waste not being seen by park guests.

Baxter asked recently elected Walt Disney Company President and COO Frank Wells what the plans were for the upstairs area. Wells said that Club 33 was vying for the space in order to add more membership slots. Baxter came to Wells with an idea for an art gallery open to park guests. The Imagineers had always wanted a place to display their artwork for the theme parks, which went largely unseen by the public. The Disney Gallery was born.

The gallery is unique in all of Disneyland because it is the only location in the entire park that is listed as both an attraction and a merchandise location on the park's map. The cast members who work the location are from the Disneyland Merchandise division, but are specially trained to run the gallery as a museum. Cast Members are encouraged to give guests free tours of the gallery, informing visitors of the facility's rich history and the current exhibition.

The Gallery's New Orleans Square location closed its doors on August 7, 2007. The space was turned into the Disneyland Dream Suite. Imagineers converted the space into a two-bedroom, two-bath guest suite, using the original 1960s designs created by designer Dorothea Redmond and set decorator Emile Kuri in consultation with Walt Disney. Walt Disney Imagineering Art Director Kim Irvine says that the suite would "be filled with things that might have inspired Walt as he dreamed of Disneyland." Each of the bedrooms feature a special nighttime lighting effect, activated at the push of a button.

Current location
The Gallery opened at its current location on Main Street U.S.A. on October 2, 2009 in the space previously occupied by the Annual Passport Center/Bank of Main Street U.S.A.

New Orleans Square Gallery layout
The Disney Gallery comprised several rooms and antechambers, as it was designed to be living quarters for the Disney family. Each room contained its own set of artwork and usually revolved around a certain theme that pertained to the overall exhibit.

Front Room/Formal Sitting Room
The first room guests walked into was known as the Front Room. This was the introductory room to the exhibit and set the stage for what lay ahead. Artwork in this room was usually more broad, getting more specific as guests progressed through the room.

As the Royal Suite, this room was known as the Formal Sitting Room. This is where Walt's guests would have spent most of their time, both before and after a meal. The guest entrance from the staircase was originally just another window when the building was first constructed. The balcony with the Pirates of the Caribbean marquee on the front was originally a false balcony and had to be reinforced to accommodate people.

Vestibule

To the left of the front room was the vestibule. This miniature hallway contained two rooms that were off-limits to guests. Upon entering the vestibule, the door on the right led to the print room, which was the nerve center for the gallery's Art-on-Demand system. When the gallery opened this room was an administrative office, used for training and other purposes. The room on the left led to a small office that was used by the management of the gallery.

The two rooms were originally designed for two very distinct purposes. The manager office was intended to be a men's smoking lounge. Walt Disney was a smoker for most of his life (and actually died from causes related to lung cancer) and planned on having a separate, ventilated room where he and his friends could light up without making anyone else uncomfortable. The print room's intended use is not clearly known, though it is presumed the room was going to be used as a guest room or a room for Walt's grandchildren to play in.

Collector's Room/Informal Sitting Room

The room to the right of the Front Room was known as the Collector's Room. The retail operation of the Gallery was located here. The merchandise changed with the exhibition, but some mainstays of the Gallery have been miniature, matted, vintage attraction posters and books about Disney art and Disney history.

The Art-on-Demand kiosks were also located here, allowing guests to choose a specific picture and have that picture custom printed for them. The system has been popular with longtime guests and offers a less-expensive alternative to lithographs, giclees, and other expensive pieces. The prints come in different sizes, with prices ranging from $15 – $50. Framing for these and other pieces is also available.

This room was originally known as the Informal Sitting Room. Often compared to a modern-day den, the Informal Sitting Room was a place for Walt and his guests to sit and relax before and after dinner. It is likely that the television would have gone in this room. There was also going to be a wet bar (used as a cash register area for the Gallery), where Walt could have mixed fancy drinks and served appetizers for his guests. Cast Members like to point out the Sub-Zero miniature refrigerator, as it is the same one installed in 1966, and it still works.

Balcony
The Collector's Room was the only way to access the Gallery's expansive balcony. Guests could sit up in the Balcony and people watch as long as they want. In the evening, the Gallery Balcony was used as a hard-ticket seating area for the Fantasmic! river show. The seats included an all-you-can-eat dessert buffet with unlimited soft drinks and coffee. The price was very steep and usually coincides with the price of Park admission.

The Balcony holds very distinctive evidence that the Disney brothers were going to share The Royal Suite. Within the wrought iron of the Balcony's barrier are the initials "WD" and "RD", for "Walt Disney" and "Roy Disney". The initials are so expertly crafted that they do not stand out from the rest of the ironwork.

The balcony is the only area in the entire gallery where Walt Disney actually stood.

Back Hallway/Grand Entrance
Traveling through the Collector's Room, guests would find the Back Hallway. This area was originally used to display collector's lithographs and other framed artwork. Sample Art-on-Demand pieces also hung in this area. In the later days of the Gallery this area was used as another exhibit room displaying artwork for viewing.

The Back Hallway was originally the Grand Entrance to the Disney apartment. The door at the rear is connected to the ground floor by a nondescript flight of stairs located in a small courtyard (the Royal Courtyard is currently occupied by an extension of the Pieces of Eight shop). The marker that denotes the address of the apartment still stands. The staircase and back door is considered off-limits to guests.

Blue Room/Formal Dining Room
The room to the right of the Back Hallway was known as the Blue Room. The name came from the color of the wall when the Gallery first opened. This was the largest exhibit area until early 2007, when the room was divided in half. One half was given to Club 33 as storage space which was then turned into Club 33's kitchen. The half that remained as the Gallery was a more intimate space. When the Blue Room was whole, a side balcony on the far side of the room was used as a VIP seating area for Fantasmic! This balcony was off-limits to guests at all times, and was only reserved for special guests of The Walt Disney Company.

This room would have been The Royal Suite's Formal Dining Room. Originally rectangular in shape, it would have accommodated a large dining room table that could have probably seated 15 - 20 guests. On the far side of the room was an outline for a doorway that would have led to the Club 33 kitchen. The Royal Suite had no real kitchen, so it was necessary for the Club's chefs to provide all the meals.

Patio

The Patio was the "hub" of the Gallery, with almost every room attached to it. The Patio contained tables and chairs, where guests could bring up food and have a meal away from the bustling crowds of the rest of the Park.

Originally conceived by Lillian Disney, the Patio was a place where Lilly could be outdoors, but away from the Park guests. Lilly also purchased the bronze fountain head sculpture, as well as other antiques located throughout the Gallery. Since she was a lover of plants, Lilly had planters installed wherever possible.

Walt also had a hand in the design of the Patio. There are air conditioning ducts located on the eaves of the roof, surrounding the patio. This was a system that Walt was experimenting with to provide air conditioning outdoors. The ducts in the eaves would provide an invisible barrier, while the ducts located underneath the eaves would actually regulate the temperature. It was never hooked up and never used.

Green Room/Master Bedroom
To left of the patio, cut off from the rest of the Gallery was the Green Room, named for the same reason as the Blue Room. This room changed little since the Gallery opened and was the largest display area in the Gallery

The room was tucked away from the rest of the Gallery because it was going to be used as the Master Bedroom. Lilly enjoyed her privacy and wanted the bedroom to be essentially off-limits to their guests. A large bay window was located next to the bedroom door (later covered by another display wall) so that Lilly could look out onto her garden patio, even when inside the room. The Master Bedroom also had a bathroom with a marble sink top, a shower alcove, and a toilet; there was no tub. The bathroom space was used as a merchandise stockroom and remained locked at all times.

Exhibition history
Since its opening on July 11, 1987, The Disney Gallery had changing exhibits to keep things fresh and current. The length of the exhibits ranged from ten years to three months.

Other locations
The first Walt Disney Gallery was opened outside of the park next to the Disney Store, Main Place Santa Ana mall in California on November 4, 1994 and was operated by Disney Store, under Doug Murphy, vice president of the Walt Disney Gallery. The prototype store was designed by Disney Imagineering.

The 3,100-square-foot store used a museum shop method for its products organized into four sections, The Animation Gallery, The Contemporary Gallery, Vintage Disney and The Gallery Shop. Doug Murphy was hired by Disney Store as manager of new business development in September 1991 promoted to head business development in April 1993 then appointed vice president of the Walt Disney Gallery for Disney Store in December 1994. In late May 1995, the store held a meet and discussion with Beauty and the Beast musical costume designer Ann Hould-Ward and offering some of her work, limited edition lithographs, original watercolor sketches, line drawing and works-in-progress collages, plus film's animation.

The main product lines are Disney animation art, collectibles, fashions and home accessories. This location was stocked with high-priced animation art, dinnerware, flatware, Lladró figures, fashion, laser discs and research books. The feature artists included Amadio-Smith Raku, Bob Kliss and Paul Butler. The store was later closed. Fashion items included marcasite cuff links and necklaces by Judith Jack, Kathrine Baumann designed pave minaudière and purse accessories, sterling silver by Judy Kuo and Bill Schiffer and Gérald Genta designed watches. Also, Nicole Miller designed a collection sold there that included backpack, eyewear case and toiletry kit. Items from Disney's private label were of higher quality. Baumann's limited edition minaudieres—-crystal covered purses shaped in the heads of Mickey and Minnie Mouse generated the most conversation. At $1,600, these jewelry boxes have been purchased by cereal heiress Mercedes Kellogg Bass, Michael Eisner's wife, Jane, diet guru Jenny Craig and others.

By 2006, another location opened in Downtown Disney, Orlando.

See also
List of past Disneyland attractions

References

External links

The Disney Gallery page on Disneyland website

Amusement rides introduced in 1994
Amusement rides introduced in 2009
Walt Disney Parks and Resorts attractions
Disneyland
Tokyo Disneyland
Main Street, U.S.A.
2009 establishments in California
1994 establishments in Japan
2016 disestablishments in Japan